Kaliyan (also Romanized as Kalīyān, Kalyān, and  Kalīān; also known as Gīlan, Kaliyūn, and Kalyūn) is a village in Dehsard Rural District, in the Central District of Arzuiyeh County, Kerman Province, Iran. At the 2006 census, its population was 50, in 12 families.

References 

Populated places in Arzuiyeh County